Clubiona abboti is a species of sac spider in the family Clubionidae. It is found in the United States and Canada.

Subspecies
These two subspecies belong to the species Clubiona abboti:
 (Clubiona abboti abboti) L. Koch, 1866
 Clubiona abboti abbotoides Chamberlin & Ivie, 1946

References

Clubionidae
Articles created by Qbugbot
Spiders described in 1866